Pietraroiasuchus is an extinct genus of hylaeochampsid eusuchian crocodylomorph from the Pietraroja Plattenkalk of the southern Apennines, Italy. Below is a cladogram showing the phylogenetic placement of Pietraroiasuchus from Buscalioni et al., 2011:

References

Early Cretaceous crocodylomorphs of Europe
Early Cretaceous reptiles of Europe
Prehistoric pseudosuchian genera